Alexander Charles Vasa (4 November 1614 – 19 November 1634) was the fifth son of King Sigismund III of Poland and his wife Constance of Austria.

During the election of 1632 he supported his brother Vladislaus IV Vasa. After his voyage to Italy and Germany in 1634, Alexander supported the movement for the war with Ottoman Empire but died before he had any significant influence on the events. He died from smallpox in Lwów or in the village of Wielkie near Warsaw on 19 November 1634.

1614 births
1634 deaths
Deaths from smallpox
Alexander Charles
Infectious disease deaths in Poland
Burials at Wawel Cathedral
Sons of kings